South Sudan, officially the Republic of South Sudan, and previously known as Southern Sudan, is a landlocked country in Middle Africa, in the area of northeast Central Africa that is part of the United Nations subregion of Eastern Africa. The economy of South Sudan is one of the world's most underdeveloped with South Sudan having little existing infrastructure and the highest maternal mortality and female illiteracy rates in the world as of 2011. South Sudan exports timber to the international market. The region also contains many natural resources such as petroleum, iron ore, copper, chromium ore, zinc, tungsten, mica, silver, gold, diamonds, hardwoods, limestone and hydropower. The country's economy, as in many other developing countries, is heavily dependent on agriculture.

Notable firms 
This list includes notable companies with primary headquarters located in the country. The industry and sector follow the Industry Classification Benchmark taxonomy. Organizations which have ceased operations are included and noted as defunct.

See also
 List of banks in South Sudan
 Banking in South Sudan
 List of airlines of South Sudan
 Economy of South Sudan

References 

 
 
South Sudan